The following is a comprehensive discography of the English alternative rock band Mansun.

Studio albums

Compilation albums

Singles
Mansun adopted a unique labeling system for their single releases. Their first two releases for the Parlophone label were Extended Plays, these were named One EP and Two EP. However, like most EPs the opening track was promoted as the key song. Subsequent singles were more focused around the opening track, but the band retained the EP label and with the exception of "Taxloss" and "I Can Only Disappoint U", all of their singles were numbered, though both those singles counted in the numbering.

The group's first single was paid and produced by the group on their own label; Sci-Fi Hi-Fi Records. The group's second single; "Skin Up Pin Up" / "Flourella" was released on the EMI affiliate Regal Records. All subsequent singles were issued by Parlophone/EMI.

Their final single, "Slipping Away", was released after the group had disbanded was commercially released as a 7" Vinyl and Download Release only

B-sides

Music videos

Miscellaneous releases
 Xmas Fanclub 7" vinyl (1998) - Live versions of "Everyone Must Win" and "Taxloss" recorded at Brixton Academy 23 October 1998
 "South of the Painted Hall" (2006) - Free Download available only to buyers of Legacy: The Best Of Mansun

Contributions
 ChildLine (1996, Polygram TV) - "Ski Jump Nose (Cliff Nourell Mix)" (various artists charity compilation for ChildLine)
 Spawn: The Soundtrack (1997, Sony) - Skin Up Pin Up" (credited as Mansun & 808 State)
 Britpop at the BBC (2014, Warner Music) - "Wide Open Space" (Studio) and "Closed For Business (Live from the BBC)"

References

Rock music discographies
Pop music discographies
Rock music group discographies
Discographies of British artists